Przybysław is a Polish given name of Slavic origin, meaning "someone who has more and more glory". Feminine form is Przybysława. The name may  refer to:

 Przybysław Dyjamentowski (1694–1774), notable Polish writer

Following places:
Przybysław, Jarocin County in Greater Poland Voivodeship (west-central Poland)
Przybysław, Słupca County in Greater Poland Voivodeship (west-central Poland)
Przybysław, Kuyavian-Pomeranian Voivodeship (north-central Poland)
Przybysław, Złotów County in Greater Poland Voivodeship (west-central Poland)
Przybysław, West Pomeranian Voivodeship (north-west Poland)
Nowy Przybysław in West Pomeranian Voivodeship (north-western Poland)
Stary Przybysław in West Pomeranian Voivodeship (north-western Poland)

See also
 Pribislav (disambiguation)
 Slavic names

Polish masculine given names
Slavic masculine given names